Wild Solutions: How Biodiversity is Money in the Bank is a 2001 book by biologists Andrew Beattie and Paul R. Ehrlich. The authors explain the value of "wild solutions" to technical and medical problems that may reside in the diversity of the Earth's estimated 5 to 10 million species. Beattie and Ehrlich describe the role of natural substances in medicine, pest control, and manufacturing. The book won a National Outdoor Book Award in 2001.
A second edition came out in 2004.

References

2001 non-fiction books
2001 in the environment
Books by Paul R. Ehrlich
Environmental non-fiction books
Science books
Books about health care